Why U, Inc. is a non-profit 501(c)(3) educational organization funded by the Goldman Charitable Foundation. Why U is dedicated to exploration through the use of digital media, of new education paradigms for the STEM subjects: Science, Technology, Engineering, and Mathematics. Why U's goal is to remove barriers to learning in the STEM subjects, and increase the public's depth of knowledge of STEM.

Why U develops and provides worldwide access to free animated videos which teach fundamental concepts in math and science in an entertaining format. Why U animated videos are designed to develop conceptual knowledge rather than procedural skill, i.e., instill in the viewer an understanding of the underlying concepts of math and science rather than promoting the memorization of problem solving procedures. The prime focus is to clearly and efficiently explain the conceptual framework at the heart of mathematical and scientific subjects in a way which engages the viewer and holds their interest. Concepts are presented in the context of a dramatic and humorous setting using animated graphics designed to communicate complex ideas in an enjoyable and exciting way. As such, Why U videos are often used as collateral material in formal learning environments around the world.

Conceptual versus procedural knowledge 

In recent years, there has been a shift in emphasis by educators from procedural to conceptual knowledge.  One benefit of a strong conceptual understanding is that a person is less likely to forget concepts than procedures. “If conceptual understanding is gained, then a person can reconstruct a procedure that may have been forgotten. On the other hand, if procedural knowledge is the limit of a person's learning, there is no way to reconstruct a forgotten procedure. Conceptual understanding in mathematics, along with procedural skill, is much more powerful than procedural skill alone.” 
“Research has shown that students in a conceptually oriented mathematics class outperform students in a procedurally oriented mathematics class on tests and on measures of attitude toward mathematics. (See, for example, Boaler, 1998; Cain, 2002; Fuson et al., 2000; Masden and Lanier, 1992.)”

History 

Why U grew out of an earlier non-profit corporation, Wired Science. In 2001, Steve Goldman created Wired Science as a charitable endeavor to develop digital kiosks that facilitate informal learning at science centers.  Wired Science creative designers included Steve Goldman, Eileen Meier, Mark Rodriguez, and Brandy Camps. In 2003 Wired Science won the Communication Arts Magazine Award of Excellence, the HOW Magazine Design Merit Award, and the American Advertising Federation Gold ADDY Award for design excellence. In 2003 Wired Science was gifted by Steve Goldman to the Orlando Science Center. Building on the experience gained from Wired Science, Why U, Inc. was founded and incorporated in 2007.

Contributors 
Why U videos are conceived and written by Steve Goldman and animated by Mark Rodriguez.

Why U videos and scripts are reviewed for correctness by mathematicians and educators from several universities, including Dr. Robert Brigham, Dr. Piotr Mikusinski, and Dr. Tammy Muhs from the University of Central Florida Mathematics Department, Dr. Mark Anderson from the Rollins College Mathematics Department, and Dr. Cheryl Avila from the University of Central Florida College of Education.

References

External links 
Why U Homepage
Why U YouTube channel

Educational organizations based in the United States
American educational websites
Online nonprofit organizations
Education-related YouTube channels
Educational technology non-profits
Open educational resources